Megasoma cedrosa is a species of rhinoceros beetle. It is endemic to Mexico and described originally from Cedros Island. The name is often misspelled as "cedrosum" or "cedros" but the original spelling (as cedrosa) is retained under ICZN Article 31.2.3, as the name is neither Latin nor Greek.

References

Dynastinae
Beetles described in 1972
Beetles of North America
Endemic insects of Mexico
Cedros Island